is one of the Japanese samurai clans.

The Koyamada Clan was headquartered in the Satsuma Domain, which was one of the most powerful feudal domains in Tokugawa Japan, and played a major role in the Meiji Restoration and in the government of the Meiji period which followed.

The direct descendant is Shin Koyamada, who was born and raised in Japan and resides in the United States.

See also
Oyamada Clan

References
Shimazu Clan
Koyamada Castle

External links
The Lineage
ShinKoyamada.jp - Shin Koyamada's official site (Japanese)

Japanese clans